Gustav Bauernfeind (4 September 1848, in Sulz am Neckar – 24 December 1904, in Jerusalem) was a German painter, illustrator and architect of partly Jewish origin. He is considered to be one of the most notable Orientalist painters of Germany.

Education and early career
After completing his architectural studies at the Polytechnic Institute in Stuttgart, he worked in the architectural firm of Professor Wilhelm Bäumer and later in that of Adolph Gnauth, where he also learned painting. In his earlier paintings, Bauernfeind focused on local views of Germany, as well as motifs from Italy.

Painting the Levant
During his journey to the Levant from 1880 to 1882, he became interested in the Orient and repeated his travels again and again. In 1896 he moved with his wife and son to Ottoman Palestine and subsequently settled in Jerusalem in 1898. He also lived and worked in Lebanon and Syria.

His work is characterized primarily by architectural views of Jerusalem and the Holy Land. The oil paintings of Bauernfeind are mostly meticulously crafted, intricately composed and almost photographically accurate cityscapes and images of known edifices. In addition, he produced landscape scenes and watercolours.

Reception
During his lifetime he was the most popular Orientalist painter of Germany, but would fade into irrelevance after his death. However, since the early 1980s, Bauernfeind was gradually rediscovered, with his paintings appearing at auctions with high prices. Thus, his oil painting The Wailing Wall was sold at Christie's in London for the equivalent of €326,000 in 1992. The same painting would reach at Sotheby's in London the equivalent of €4.5 million in a later auction in 2007. In 1997, another oil painting of Bauernfeind, The Port of Jaffa, was sold at the Van Ham Kunstauktionen in Cologne for 1,510,000 DM, thus becoming the most expensive 19th-century painting ever sold in Germany.

Legacy
At his birthplace in Sulz am Neckar, the life and work of the painter is commemorated by the Gustav Bauernfeind Museum with a large permanent exhibition.

Work

Gallery

Select list of paintings

 Castel Gandolfo am Albaner See, 1864 (Drawing)
 Markt in Jaffa, 1877 (Oil painting)
 Der Hafen von Jaffa, 1888 (Oil painting)
 Straßenszene in Damaskus, um 1887 (Oil painting, 51 × 68 cm)
 Jaffa, Einziehung der türkischen Landwehr in Palästina, 1888 (Oil painting)
 Die Klagemauer, Jerusalem, 1890 (Oil painting, 130 × 101 cm)
 Straße in Jerusalem (Oil painting, 109 × 82 cm)
 Ansicht der deutschen Kolonie in Haifa, 1898 (Oil painting)
 Jerusalem, Blick von unten auf den Felsendom (Oil painting, 109 × 82 cm)
 Eingang zum Tempelberg, Jerusalem (Oil painting, 102 × 70 cm)

Books

 Die Reise nach Damaskus. 1888/89. Tagebuchaufzeichnungen des Orientmalers, herausgegeben von Hugo Schmid unter Mitarbeit von Otto Höschle, Tübingen und Basel 1996

Bibliography
 Hugo Schmid: Der Maler Gustav Bauernfeind (1848–1904) und der Orient. Mit einer Einführung von Petra S. Versteegh-Kühner. Hauswedell, Stuttgart 2004, 208 (XX) S., 
 Hugo Schmid: Der Maler Gustav Bauernfeind. 1848–1904. H. Schmid, Sulz 1980, 149 S.
 Alex Carmel, Hugo Schmid (Bearb.), Gustav Bauernfeind (Ill.): Der Orientmaler Gustav Bauernfeind. 1848–1904. Leben und Werk/The life and work of Gustav Bauernfeind, orientalist painter. Herausgegeben in Zusammenarbeit mit dem Gottlieb-Schumacher-Institut zur Erforschung des Christlichen Beitrages zum Wiederaufbau Palästinas im 19. Jahrhundert an der Universität Haifa, Israel. Hauswedell, Stuttgart 1990, 360 (XII) S., 
 Petra S. Kühner: Gustav Bauernfeind. Gemälde und Aquarelle. Monographien zur bildenden Kunst, Band 5. (Dissertationsschrift.) Lang, Frankfurt am Main, Berlin, Bern, New York, Paris und Wien 1996, 315 (X) S., 
 Hugo Schmid, Otto Höschle (Bearb.), Gustav Bauernfeind (Autor): Die Reise nach Damaskus 1888/1889. Tagebuchaufzeichnungen des Orientmalers. Francke, Tübingen 1996, 135 Seiten. .
 Hugo Schmid: Der Orientmaler Gustav Bauernfeind in Italien. Geiger, Horb 2008, 128 Seiten. .

See also
 List of German painters
 List of Orientalist artists
 Orientalism

References

Attribution
 This article is based on the translation of the corresponding article of the German Wikipedia.

External links

 

1848 births
1904 deaths
People from Sulz am Neckar
People from the Kingdom of Württemberg
German people of Jewish descent
19th-century German painters
19th-century German male artists
20th-century German painters
20th-century German male artists
German male painters
German orientalists
Holy Land travellers
Orientalism
Orientalist painters
German male non-fiction writers